Rosalind Franklin, previously known as the ExoMars rover, is a planned robotic Mars rover, part of the international ExoMars programme led by the European Space Agency and the Russian Roscosmos State Corporation. The mission was scheduled to launch in July 2020, but was postponed to 2022. The 2022 Russian invasion of Ukraine has caused an indefinite delay of the programme, as the member states of the ESA voted to suspend the joint mission with Russia; in July 2022, ESA terminated its cooperation on the project with Russia. As of May 2022, the launch of the rover is not expected to occur before 2028 due to the need for a new non-Russian landing platform.

The original plan called for a Russian launch vehicle, an ESA carrier model, and a Russian lander named Kazachok, that would deploy the rover to Mars' surface. Once it had safely landed, the solar powered rover would begin a seven-month (218-sol) mission to search for the existence of past life on Mars. The Trace Gas Orbiter (TGO), launched in 2016, will operate as the data-relay satellite of Rosalind Franklin and the lander.

The rover is named after Rosalind Franklin, a British chemist and DNA pioneer.

History

Design 
ESA returned to this original rover design after NASA descoped its involvement in a joint rover mission that was studied from 2009 to 2012.

The rover will carry a  sub-surface sampling drill and Analytical Laboratory Drawer (ALD), supporting the nine 'Pasteur payload' science instruments. The rover will search for biomolecules or biosignatures from past life.

Twin Rover
Like all other martian rovers the ExoMars team also built a twin rover for Rosalind Franklin, dryly known as the Ground Test Model (GTM), with the nickname Amalia. This test model borrows its name from Professor Amalia Ercoli Finzi, a renowned astrophysicist with broad experience in spaceflight dynamics. Amalia has so far demonstrated drilling soil samples down to 1.7 meters and operating all the instruments while sending scientific data to the Rover Operations Control Centre (ROCC), the operational hub that will orchestrate the roaming of the European-built rover on Mars. It is currently in a Mars terrain simulator at the ALTEC premises in Turin. Engineers are using the Amalia rover to recreate different scenarios and help them take decisions that will keep Rosalind safe in the challenging environment of Mars and to run risky operations, from driving around martian slopes seeking the best path for science operations to drilling and analyzing rocks.

Construction 
The lead builder of the rover, the British division of Airbus Defence and Space, began procuring critical components in March 2014. In December 2014, ESA member states approved the funding for the rover, to be sent on the second launch in 2018, but insufficient funds had already started to threaten a launch delay until 2020. The wheels and suspension system were paid for by the Canadian Space Agency and were manufactured by MDA Corporation in Canada. Roscosmos will provide radioisotope heater units (RHU) for the rover to keep its electronic components warm at night. The rover was assembled by Airbus DS in the UK during 2018 and 2019.

Launch schedule and delays 
By March 2013, the spacecraft was scheduled to launch in 2018 with a Mars landing in early 2019. Delays in European and Russian industrial activities and deliveries of scientific payloads forced the launch to be pushed back. In May 2016, ESA announced that the mission had been moved to the next available launch window of July 2020. ESA ministerial meetings in December 2016 reviewed mission issues including  ExoMars funding and lessons learned from the ExoMars 2016 Schiaparelli mission, which had crashed after its atmospheric entry and parachute descent (the 2020 mission drawing on Schiaparelli heritage for elements of its entry, descent and landing systems). In March 2020, ESA delayed the launch to August–October 2022 due to parachute testing issues. This was later refined to a twelve-day launch window starting on 20 September until 1 October 2022, with a scheduled landing around 10 June 2023. The worsening diplomatic crisis over the 2022 Russian invasion of Ukraine cast doubt over a 2022 launch, due to the plan to use Russian launch and landing hardware. On 17 March 2022, the ESA announced that the launch of the rover has been suspended, with the earliest new date being sometime in late 2024. As of May 2022, the launch is expected to occur no earlier than 2028.

Naming 
In July 2018, the European Space Agency launched a public outreach campaign to choose a name for the rover. On 7 February 2019, the ExoMars rover was named Rosalind Franklin in honour of scientist Rosalind Franklin (1920-1958), who made key contributions to the understanding of the molecular structures of DNA (deoxyribonucleic acid), RNA (ribonucleic acid), viruses, coal, and graphite.

Navigation 

The rover is designed to operate for at least seven months and drive , after landing.

Since the rover communicates with the ground controllers via the ExoMars Trace Gas Orbiter (TGO), and the orbiter only passes over the rover approximately twice per sol, the ground controllers will not be able to actively guide the rover across the surface. The Rosalind Franklin rover is therefore designed to navigate autonomously across the Martian surface. Two stereo camera pairs (NavCam and LocCam) allow the rover to build up a 3D map of the terrain, which the navigation software then uses to assess the terrain around the rover so that it avoids obstacles and finds an efficient route to the ground controller specified destination.

On 27 March 2014, a "Mars Yard" was opened at Airbus Defence and Space in Stevenage, UK, to facilitate the development and testing of the rover's autonomous navigation system.

Pasteur payload 

The rover will search for two types of subsurface life signatures, morphological and chemical. It will not analyse atmospheric samples, and it has no dedicated meteorological station, although the Kazachok lander that will deploy the rover is equipped with a meteorological station. The  scientific payload comprises the following survey and analytical instruments:

Panoramic Camera (PanCam) 

PanCam has been designed to perform digital terrain mapping for the rover and to search for morphological signatures of past biological activity preserved on the texture of surface rocks. The PanCam Optical Bench (OB) mounted on the Rover mast includes two wide angle cameras (WACs) for multi-spectral stereoscopic panoramic imaging, and a high resolution camera (HRC) for high-resolution colour imaging. PanCam will also support the scientific measurements of other instruments by taking high-resolution images of locations that are difficult to access, such as craters or rock walls, and by supporting the selection of the best sites to carry out exobiology studies. In addition to the OB, PanCam includes a calibration target (PCT), Fiducial Markers (FidMs) and Rover Inspection Mirror (RIM). The PCT's stained glass calibration targets will provide a UV-stable reflectance and colour reference for PanCam and ISEM, allowing for the generation of calibrated data products.

Infrared Spectrometer for ExoMars (ISEM) 

The ISEM optical box will be installed on the rover's mast, below PanCam's HRC, with an electronics box inside the Rover. It will be used to assess bulk mineralogy characterization and remote identification of water-related minerals. Working with PanCam, ISEM will contribute to the selection of suitable samples for further analysis by the other instruments.

Water Ice Subsurface Deposits Observation on Mars (WISDOM) 

WISDOM is a ground-penetrating radar that will explore the subsurface of Mars to identify layering and help select interesting buried formations from which to collect samples for analysis. It can transmit and receive signals using two Vivaldi-antennas mounted on the aft section of the rover, with electronics inside the Rover. Electromagnetic waves penetrating into the ground are reflected at places where there is a sudden transition in the electrical parameters of the soil. These data, combined with those produced by the other survey instruments and by the analyses carried out on previously collected samples, will be used to support drilling activities.

Adron-RM 

Adron-RM is a neutron spectrometer to search for subsurface water ice and hydrated minerals. It is housed inside the Rover and will be used in combination with the WISDOM ground-penetrating radar to study the subsurface beneath the rover and to search for optimal sites for drilling and sample collection.

Close-Up Imager (CLUPI) 

CLUPI, mounted on the drill box, will visually study rock targets at close range with sub-millimetre resolution. This instrument will also investigate the fines produced during drilling operations, and image samples collected by the drill. CLUPI has variable focusing and can obtain high-resolution images at longer distances. The CLUPI imaging unit is complemented by two mirrors and a calibration target.

Mars Multispectral Imager for Subsurface Studies (Ma_MISS) 

Ma_MISS is an infrared spectrometer located inside the core drill. Ma_MISS will observe the lateral wall of the borehole created by the drill to study the subsurface stratigraphy, to understand the distribution and state of water-related minerals, and to characterise the geophysical environment. The analyses of unexposed material by Ma_MISS, together with data obtained with the spectrometers located inside the rover, will be crucial for the unambiguous interpretation of the original conditions of Martian rock formation. The composition of the regolith and crustal rocks provides important information about the geologic evolution of the near-surface crust, the evolution of the atmosphere and climate, and the existence of past life.

MicrOmega 

MicrOmega is an infrared hyperspectral microscope housed within the Rover's ALD that can analyse the powder material derived from crushing samples collected by the core drill. Its objective is to study mineral grain assemblages in detail to try to unravel their geological origin, structure, and composition. These data will be vital for interpreting past and present geological processes and environments on Mars. Because MicrOmega is an imaging instrument, it can also be used to identify grains that are particularly interesting, and assign them as targets for Raman and MOMA-LDMS observations.

Raman Laser Spectrometer (RLS) 

RLS is a Raman spectrometer housed within the ALD that will provide geological and mineralogical context information complementary to that obtained by MicrOmega. It is a very fast and useful technique employed to identify mineral phases produced by water-related processes. It will help to identify organic compounds and search for life by identifying the mineral products and indicators of biologic activities (biosignatures).

Mars Organic Molecule Analyzer (MOMA) 

MOMA is the rover's largest instrument, housed within the ALD. It will conduct a broad-range, very-high sensitivity search for organic molecules in the collected sample. It includes two different ways for extracting organics: laser desorption and thermal volatilisation, followed by separation using four GC-MS columns. The identification of the evolved organic molecules is performed with an ion trap mass spectrometer. The Max Planck Institute for Solar System Research is leading the development. International partners include NASA. The mass spectrometer is provided from the Goddard Space Flight Center, while the GC is provided by the two French institutes LISA and LATMOS. The UV-Laser is being developed by the Laser Zentrum Hannover.

Payload support functions 
Sampling from beneath the Martian surface with the intent to reach and analyze material unaltered or minimally affected by cosmic radiation is the strongest advantage of Rosalind Franklin. The ExoMars core drill was fabricated in Italy with heritage from the earlier DeeDri development, and incorporates the Ma_MISS instrument (see above). The CSTM drawer is then closed and the sample dropped into a crushing station. The resulting powder is fed by a dosing station into receptacles on the ALD's sample carousel: either the refillable container - for examination by MicrOmega, RLS and MOMA-LDMS - or a MOMA-GC oven. The system will complete experiment cycles and at least two vertical surveys down to 2 m (with four sample acquisitions each). This means that a minimum number of 17 samples shall be acquired and delivered by the drill for subsequent analysis.

De-scoped instruments 

The proposed payload has changed several times. The last major change was after the program switched from the larger rover concept back to the previous  rover design in 2012.

 Mars X-Ray Diffractometer (Mars-XRD) - Powder diffraction of X-rays would have determined the composition of crystalline minerals. This instrument includes also an X-ray fluorescence capability that can provide useful atomic composition information. The identification of concentrations of carbonates, sulphides or other aqueous minerals may be indicative of a Martian [hydrothermal] system capable of preserving traces of life. In other words, it would have examined the past Martian environmental conditions, and more specifically the identification of conditions related to life.
The Urey instrument was planned to search for organic compounds in Martian rocks and soils as evidence for past life and/or prebiotic chemistry. Starting with a hot water extraction, only soluble compounds are left for further analysis. Sublimation, and capillary electrophoresis makes it possible to identify amino acids. The detection would have been done by laser-induced fluorescence, a highly sensitive technique, capable of parts-per-trillion sensitivity. These measurements were to be made at a thousand times greater sensitivity than the Viking GCMS experiment.
Miniaturised Mössbauer Spectrometer (MIMOS-II) provides the mineralogical composition of iron-bearing surface rocks, sediments and soils. Their identification was to aid in understanding water and climate evolution and search for biomediated iron-sulfides and magnetites, which could provide evidence for former life on Mars.
The Life Marker Chip (LMC) was for some time part of the planned payload. This instrument was intended to use a surfactant solution to extract organic matter from samples of martian rock and soil, then detect the presence of specific organic compounds using an antibody-based assay.
Mars Infrared Mapper (MIMA), a Fourier IR spectrometer operating in the 2-25 µm range that was to be mounted on the rover's mast to investigate the martian surface and atmosphere.

Landing site selection 

After a review by an ESA-appointed panel, a short list of four sites was formally recommended in October 2014 for further detailed analysis.  These landing sites exhibit evidence of a complex aqueous history in the past.
Mawrth Vallis
Oxia Planum
Hypanis Vallis
Aram Dorsum

On 21 October 2015, Oxia Planum was chosen as the preferred landing site for the rover, with Aram Dorsum and Mawrth Vallis as backup options. In March 2017 the Landing Site Selection Working Group narrowed the choice to Oxia Planum and Mawrth Vallis, and in November 2018, Oxia Planum was once again chosen, pending sign-off by the heads of the European and Russian space agencies.

After Kazachok lands, it will extend a ramp to deploy the Rosalind Franklin rover to the surface. The lander will remain stationary and will start a two-year mission to investigate the surface environment at the landing site.

See also 

 
 
 List of missions to Mars

References

External links 

 ExoMars rover at ESA.int
 ExoMars rover  at CNES.fr
 ExoMars rover at NASA.gov
  by NASA/Goddard

ExoMars
Mars rovers
Proposed space probes
Proposed astrobiology space missions
European Space Agency space probes
Attached spacecraft
2028 in spaceflight
Events affected by the 2022 Russian invasion of Ukraine